Wincobank  is an Iron Age hill fort near Wincobank in Sheffield, England.

Location

The fort stands on an isolated sandstone hill that forms the northern side of the river valley of the River Don.

Description

A counterscarp consisting of a rubble core was created from material excavated when digging the ditch. The outward side of the earthen rampart was reinforced with stone facings held together with timbers. These timbers show signs of being vitrified, the charring indicates they were subjected to intense heat (ie burning). Maybe as a result of inter-tribal conflict in the late Iron Age.

Breaks in the rampart on the north-east and south-west sides were once considered to be the fort's original entrances; this conclusion is now considered incorrect. The real entrance is on the south-east ramparts where the bank turn inwards slightly at this point. A mound set close to the rampart is thought to be the site of a watch tower.

Human occupation
Early antiquarians thought the Romans built the fort. Archaeologists now think it was constructed by the Celtic Brigantes tribe. Some historians suggest that this fort was part of a 1st-century defensive line built by the Brigantes attempting to halt the northward expansion by the Romans. This defensive line is suggested to have included hill forts at Carl Wark and Scholes Coppice, and an ancient dyke called Roman Rig that runs from the fort northeast to Mexborough.<ref>{{cite book|last=Hunter|first= Joseph|year=1819|title= An inquiry into the early state and remote history of the Parish of Sheffield. In: Hallamshire. The History and Topography of the Parish of Sheffield in the County of York|pages=15–23|publisher= London: Lackington, Hughes, Harding, Mayor & Jones}}</ref>

The hill was first recorded in 1442 as Wincowe and appears to be derived from Wineca, an Anglo-Saxon personal name and the Old Norse word haugr'' meaning a mound or hill and so meaning Wineca’s hill.

During the defence of Sheffield in the Second World War, an anti-aircraft gun and searchlight emplacement was built adjacent to the south-west corner of the fort.

References

External links
Friends of Wincobank Hill
Sheffield City Council

Hills and edges of South Yorkshire
Hill forts in South Yorkshire
History of Sheffield
Buildings and structures in Sheffield
Scheduled monuments in South Yorkshire